Pereiaslav River Port is an enterprise in the field of river transport. It is located on the Dnipro in Pereiaslav on the banks of the Kaniv Reservoir. It is a branch of the Kyiv River Port.

History
Pereiaslav-Khmelnytsky River Port, operates, although not in large quantities. Decisive for it was the decision of Prime Minister Volodymyr Groysman to use the port as the main transshipment point for agricultural products for further transportation to the final destination by road. This decision caused great resonance. But as comical as it may sound, this was the first shipment of melons in the last 14 years. In November 2020, for the first time in a long time, it received international cargo from Bulgaria.

Production capacity
 Bolver berth 105 m long
 Total area of ​​the site - 2 hectares
 Length of the berth wall is 145 m, the depth is 3.5 m

See also
Kyiv River Port
Rzhyshchiv River Port
Cargo turnover of Ukrainian ports

References

Companies of Ukraine by city
Cities in Kyiv Oblast
Economy of Ukraine by city
River ports of Ukraine